Blankenese is a railway station on the Altona-Blankenese line, part of the Hamburg S-Bahn, located in the suburb of Blankenese in the borough of Altona, Hamburg, Germany. The station opened in 1867, and is a heritage site.

It is a terminus, trains of the city train line S11 end here and the other line S1 change their direction.

See also
Hamburger Verkehrsverbund
List of Hamburg S-Bahn stations

References
Name, station code and category: Liste Bahnhofskategorie 2008, DB Station&Service AG, Köthener Straße 2, 10963 Berlin (2008)

External links

DB station information 

Hamburg S-Bahn stations in Hamburg
Hamburg Blankenese
Hamburg Blankenese
Heritage sites in Hamburg
Buildings and structures in Altona, Hamburg